Jai Erlom Semenyo (born 13 July 2003) is a footballer who plays as a defender for Cardiff City. Born in England, he has been called up to represent Ghana as a youth international.

Career

On 6 February 2022 Semenyo debuted for Cardiff City in a 3-1 defeat to Liverpool in the FA CUP. 9 August 2022 Semenyo debeuted at Cardiff City Stadium for Cardiff City in the EFL Cup 3-0 defeat to Portsmouth as a second-half substitute.

Personal life

He is the brother of Ghana international Antoine Semenyo.

References

External links
 

2003 births
Living people
Cardiff City F.C. players
Ghanaian footballers
English footballers